A proxy war is an armed conflict between two states or non-state actors, one or both of which act at the instigation or on behalf of other parties that are not directly involved in the hostilities. In order for a conflict to be considered a proxy war, there must be a direct, long-term relationship between external actors and the belligerents involved. The aforementioned relationship usually takes the form of funding, military training, arms, or other forms of material assistance which assist a belligerent party in sustaining its war effort.

History
During classical antiquity and the Middle Ages, many non-state proxies were external parties that were introduced to an internal conflict and aligned themselves with a belligerent to gain influence and to further their own interests in the region. Proxies could be introduced by an external or local power and most commonly took the form of irregular armies which were used to achieve their sponsor's goals in a contested region. Some medieval states like the Byzantine Empire used proxy warfare as a foreign policy tool by deliberately cultivating intrigue among hostile rivals and then backing them when they went to war with each other. Other states regarded proxy wars as merely a useful extension of a pre-existing conflict, such as France and England during the Hundred Years' War, both of which initiated a longstanding practice of supporting privateers, which targeted the other's merchant shipping. France used England's turmoil of the Wars of the Roses from their victory as a proxy against the Burgundian State. The Ottoman Empire likewise used the Barbary pirates as proxies to harass Western European powers in the Mediterranean Sea.

‌Frequent application of the term "proxy war" indicates its prominent place in academic researches on international relations. Separate implementation of soft power and hard power proved to be unsuccessful in recent years. Accordingly, great failures in classic wars increased tendencies towards proxy wars. Since the early 20th century, proxy wars have most commonly taken the form of states assuming the role of sponsors to non-state proxies and essentially using them as fifth columns to undermine adversarial powers. That type of proxy warfare includes external support for a faction engaged in a civil war, terrorists, national liberation movements, and insurgent groups, or assistance to a national revolt against foreign occupation. For example, the British government partially organized and instigated the Arab Revolt to undermine the Ottoman Empire during the First World War. Many proxy wars began assuming a distinctive ideological dimension after the Spanish Civil War, which pitted the fascist political ideology of Italy and Nazi Germany against the communist ideology of the Soviet Union without involving these states in open warfare with each other. Sponsors of both sides also used the Spanish conflict as a proving ground for their own weapons and battlefield tactics.

During the Cold War, proxy warfare was motivated by fears that a conventional war between the United States and the Soviet Union would result in nuclear holocaust, which rendered the use of ideological proxies a safer way of exercising hostilities. The Soviet government found that supporting parties antagonistic to Americans and other Western nations to be a cost-effective way to combat NATO's influence, compared to direct military engagement. Besides, the proliferation of televised media and its impact on public perception made the US public especially susceptible to war-weariness and skeptical of risking life abroad. That encouraged the American practice of arming insurgent forces, such as the funneling of supplies to the mujahideen during the Soviet–Afghan War. Other examples of proxy war are the Korean War, and the Vietnam War.

Abstract

A significant disparity in the belligerents' conventional military strength may motivate the weaker party to begin or continue a conflict through allied nations or non-state actors. Such a situation arose during the Arab–Israeli conflict, which continued as a series of proxy wars following Israel's decisive defeat of the Arab coalitions in the 1948 Arab–Israeli War, the Six-Day War and the Yom Kippur War. The coalition members, upon their failure to achieve military dominance via direct conventional warfare, have since resorted to funding armed insurgent and paramilitary organizations, such as Hezbollah, to engage in irregular combat against Israel. The Iran–Israel proxy conflict involves threats and hostility by Iran's leaders against Israel.

Additionally, the governments of some nations, particularly liberal democracies, may choose to engage in proxy warfare (despite their military superiority) if most of their citizens oppose declaring or entering a conventional war. That featured prominently in US strategy following the Vietnam War because of the so-called "Vietnam Syndrome" of extreme war weariness among the American population. That was also a significant factor in motivating the US to enter conflicts such as the Syrian Civil War by proxy actors after a series of costly drawn-out direct engagements in the Middle East spurred a recurrence of war weariness, the "War on Terror syndrome."

Nations may also resort to proxy warfare to avoid potential negative international reactions from allied nations, profitable trading partners, or intergovernmental organizations such as the United Nations. That is especially significant when standing peace treaties, acts of the alliance or other international agreements ostensibly forbid direct warfare. Breaking such agreements could lead to a variety of negative consequences due to either negative international reaction (see above), punitive provisions listed in the prior agreement, or retaliatory action by the other parties and their allies.

In some cases, nations may be motivated to engage in proxy warfare because of financial concerns: supporting irregular troops, insurgents, non-state actors, or less-advanced allied militaries (often with obsolete or surplus equipment) can be significantly cheaper than deploying national armed forces, and the proxies usually bear the brunt of casualties and economic damage resulting from prolonged conflict.

Another common motivating factor is the existence of a security dilemma. A nation may use military intervention to install a more favorable government in a third-party state. Rival nations may perceive the intervention as a weakened position to their own security and may respond by attempting to undermine such efforts, often by backing parties favorable to their own interests (such as those directly or indirectly under their control, sympathetic to their cause, or ideologically aligned). In that case, if one or both rivals come to believe that their favored faction is at a disadvantage, they will often respond by escalating military and/or financial support. If their counterpart(s), perceiving a material threat or desiring to avoid the appearance of weakness or defeat, follow suit, a proxy war ensues between the two powers. That was a major factor in many of the proxy wars during the Cold War between the United States and the Soviet Union, as well as in the ongoing series of conflicts between Saudi Arabia and Iran, especially in Yemen and Syria.

Effects
Proxy wars can have a huge impact, especially on the local area. A proxy war with significant effects occurred between the United States and the Soviet Union during the Vietnam War. Operation Rolling Thunder, a U.S bombing campaign in North Vietnam destroyed significant amounts of infrastructure. Many bombs were also dropped on North Vietnamese supply routes in Cambodia and Laos. Equally, if not more, significant was the Soviet–Afghan War, which saw the U.S. fund the Afghan mujahideen against the invading Soviet forces (see Operation Cyclone). This war cost hundreds of thousands of lives and billions of dollars, bankrupting the Soviet Union and contributing to its collapse.

The conflict in the Middle East between Saudi Arabia and Iran is another example of the destructive impact of proxy wars. Since 2003, nearly 500,000 have died in the Iraqi conflict. Since 2011, more than 500,000 have died in the Syrian Civil War. In the Yemeni Civil War, over 1,000 have died in April 2015. In the war in Afghanistan, more than 17,000 were killed between 2009 and 2015. In Pakistan, more than 57,000 have been killed since 2003.

In general, lengths, intensities, and scales of armed conflicts are often greatly increased if belligerents' capabilities are augmented by external support. Belligerents are often less likely to engage in diplomatic negotiations, peace talks are less likely to bear fruit, and damage to infrastructure can be many times greater.

See also
Grey-zone (international relations)
China–North Korea relations
Hybrid warfare

Examples

Further reading
 Tom Stevenson, "In the Grey Zone" (review of Eli Berman and David A. Lake, Proxy Wars: Suppressing Violence through Local Agents, Cornell, 2019, ; Tyrone L. Groh, Proxy War: The Least Bad Option, Stanford, 2019, ; Andreas Krieg and Jean-Marc Rickli, Surrogate Warfare: The Transformation of War in the 21st Century, Georgetown, 2019), London Review of Books, vol. 42, no. 20 (22 October 2020), pp. 41–43. "Nuclear weapons – judged, for now at least, to be too powerful to be used – seem to preclude wars of destruction between major powers today." (p. 43.)

References

External links

Wars by type
Warfare by type